"The Middle" is a song by American rock band Jimmy Eat World. It was released in October 2001 as the second single of their fourth album, Bleed American (2001). It was a number-five hit on the US Billboard Hot 100 in 2002 and reached the top 50 in Australia, Ireland, New Zealand and the United Kingdom. The song was a breakthrough hit for Jimmy Eat World, who had self-financed the recording of the Bleed American album after being dropped by Capitol Records in 1999. It is considered the band's signature song.

Background and composition
"The Middle" was written after Jimmy Eat World had been dropped from Capitol Records following the release of Clarity, their previous album. Their second album, Static Prevails, had sold just 10,000 copies in 1996 and Capitol Records decided to drop the band in 1999 due to a change in priorities. Singer and guitarist Jim Adkins explained to the Dallas Observer: "We were just about invisible there and it wasn't going to get any better."

"The Middle" reflects these trying times for the band with lyrics about "Don't write yourself off yet" when feeling "left out or looked down on." The band decided to finance the recording of the album and keep things simple on the new record rather than experiment, as they had done on previous records. "On our new stuff, rather than challenging ourselves [by] getting real experimental, we kind of went in the other direction, challenging ourselves by getting very simple."

Release and reception
When "The Middle" was released, the success of the album and the band was dependent on the single breaking through. By early 2002, the song had reached the top of the Billboard Modern Rock Tracks chart. The song then crossed over to top 40 radio, resulting in it reaching a peak of number five on the Billboard Hot 100. Although they would have more Top 40 hits on the former chart, "The Middle" remains their sole Top 40 hit on the Hot 100 to date. It was also the band's only appearance on the Billboard Mainstream Rock Tracks chart, peaking at number 39. The song also charted in the UK, reaching a peak of number 26 in 2002. "The Middle" was the most commercially successful single released from Bleed American. The band toured extensively behind the album, touring with Weezer, Tenacious D, Green Day, Blink-182, and the Vans Warped Tour as well as the band's own headlining tour.

"The Middle" was the most played song on radio in Canada in 2002. Pitchfork Media named the track number 165 on its list of the top 500 tracks of the 2000s. Reviewer Mark Richardson wrote of the track: "And if your band delivers that message of hope with the kind of power-pop chorus hook that gives the best couple of Weezer songs a run for their money, you've accomplished something."

In 2012, The A.V. Club published an article entitled, "How Jimmy Eat World's 'The Middle' Became the Best Song for a Bad Time", with Jason Heller noting, "'The Middle' wasn't a sellout. It was a return to form, one made by a band that had a lot more wisdom, scars, and songwriting talent than it did seven years prior—and a band that was in a position where do or die looked like the only options."

Critics compared Kelly Clarkson's single "Heartbeat Song" (2015) to "The Middle" due to a notable similarity between the melodies of the songs' verses, as well as their choruses. In his review for Idolator, Stern observed both songs' similitude. Hunter Hauk of The Dallas Morning News also remarked of the two songs' similarities, but was ambivalent of "Heartbeat Song"'s lack of innovation as compared to Clarkson's previous lead singles.

In July 2022, a bootleg recording of Prince covering the song at an after-party for the 2009 Oscars resurfaced online. Adkins and drummer Zach Lind were played the cover during an interview with Rock Sound, with Adkins describing the cover as "such a trip".

Music video
The song's video (directed by Paul Fedor) featuring young people in underwear received plenty of play on MTV, especially on Total Request Live.

The music video features a fully clothed teenage boy (Josh Keleher) who attends a pool party at which Jimmy Eat World is playing, only to find everyone, except the band, in their underwear. Much of the crowd is making out, but the boy is excluded. Finally, out of frustration, he starts to strip to be like the others, only to bump into a teenage girl doing the same thing in the closet he is in. The kids keep their clothes on and leave the party, arms around each other, as the song concludes.

Track listings

US CD single
 "The Middle"
 "If You Don't Don't" (XFM Session)
 "Game of Pricks" (Radio 1 Session)
 "The Middle" (CD-ROM video)

UK 7-inch and cassette single
A. "The Middle"
B. "A Praise Chorus" (Radio 1 Session)

UK CD single
 "The Middle" (LP version) – 2:48
 "No Sensitivity" (non LP version) – 3:41

European CD single
 "The Middle" (LP version) – 2:48
 "No Sensitivity" (non LP version) – 3:41
 "The Middle" (early demo) – 2:48
 "My Sundown" (demo) – 3:09

Australian CD single
 "The Middle" (LP version) – 2:48
 "No Sensitivity" (non LP version) – 3:41
 "The Middle" (early demo) – 2:48
 "The Middle" (video)

Charts and certifications

Weekly charts

Year-end charts

Certifications

Release history

References

 Contemporary Musicians 2002 article on Jimmy Eat World. Gale.
 Entertainment Weekly, June 21, 2002.
 Review of Futures. Spin, November 2004.
 Vanderhoff, Mark. [ Review of Bleed American]. Allmusic.

External links
 
 

2001 singles
2001 songs
DreamWorks Records singles
Jimmy Eat World songs